The Museum of Contemporary Art Shanghai (MoCA Shanghai) is a contemporary art museum in the city of Shanghai, China. It is located within People's Park, north of People's Square, the location of a former racecourse that now holds the central administrative building and museums of Shanghai. Surrounding buildings include the Municipal Government Headquarters, the Shanghai Grand Theatre, the Shanghai Art Museum and the Shanghai Museum.

History
MOCA Shanghai was founded in 2005 by the Samuel Kung Foundation as the first non-profit, independent, contemporary art institution in Shanghai. The glass building that houses the exhibitions is a reworking of the former People's Park Greenhouse by Atelier Liu Yuyang Architects. The ground floor and first level of the museum have a total of 1,800 square meters (19,400 square feet) of exhibition space, with the two levels connected by a sweeping steel ramp.

Exhibitions
The museum has focused on the promotion of Chinese and international contemporary art with a set of diverse exhibitions that include both well-known and fledgling contemporary Chinese artists, as well as retrospectives for leading names of the fashion and creative world (recently including Salvatore Ferragamo, Chanel, and Pixar). The Summer 2012 exhibition was one such retrospective for Van Cleef & Arpels, entitled Timeless Beauty. In the past, MoCA has partnered with international organizations to host significant exhibitions. In 2007, MoCA partnered with the Solomon R. Guggenheim Museum to present the contemporary works from the major survey exhibition, Art in America. More recently, MoCA collaborated with the Korea Foundation to present Nostalgia: East Asia Contemporary Art Exhibition, which included works from China, Taiwan, Japan, and Korea. Other international exhibitions include contemporary art from Indonesia, Hungary (in conjunction with the Shanghai Expo), Italy, and India, and an exhibition on Finnish Design in collaboration with Marimekko. Furthermore, MoCA holds a biennale, MoCA Envisage, which focuses on Chinese contemporary art and considers its recent direction and themes.

In addition to exhibitions, MoCA runs seminars, talks, and educational programs throughout the year, for both adults and children.

MoCA on the Park
The third floor of MoCA Shanghai is host to "MoCA on the Park" (formerly "Art Lab"), a full restaurant equipped with rooftop patio and bar. Various artworks populate the space, including those by Raymond Choy, Qu Guangci, Silvia Prada, Zhang Lian xi, Freeman Lau, Raman Hui, Yan Lei, and Xiang Jing. The restaurant also hosts a number of private events and opening ceremonies.

See also

 M50 Art District
 List of museums in China
 List of contemporary art museums

Notes

References
 LIAN Zhan visited MOCA for PIXAR 25YEARS OF ANIMATION
 KUSAMA YAYOI A dream I dreamed  ELLECHINA
 KUSAMA YAYOI ASIAN TOUR EXHIBITION
 ANIMAMIX BIENNALE
 Aura of poetry 2014.07.12
 Aura of poetry curator interview art.ifeng 2014.07.15

Further reading

External links
 MoCA Shanghai official website

2005 establishments in China
Art museums established in 2005
Museums in Shanghai
Contemporary art galleries in China